Daniel Desmond Domenico  (born 1972) is a United States district judge of the United States District Court for the District of Colorado.

Biography 

Domenico earned his Bachelor of Arts, magna cum laude, from Georgetown University, and his Juris Doctor from the University of Virginia School of Law, where he was inducted into the Order of the Coif and served as an editor of the Virginia Law Review.

After graduating from law school, he was an associate at Hogan & Hartson and then served as a law clerk to Judge Timothy Tymkovich of the United States Court of Appeals for the Tenth Circuit.

In 2004, Domenico was counsel to John Thune's ultimately successful campaign for U.S. Senate.

From 2006 to 2015, he served as the Solicitor General of Colorado, where he oversaw major litigation for the state and represented governors from both the Democratic and Republican parties. During his time as Solicitor General, he argued in state and federal courts, including the Supreme Court of the United States, and received the Supreme Court Best Brief Award from the National Association of Attorneys General. At the time of his appointment, he was the youngest state solicitor general in the country, and his nine years of service made him the longest serving solicitor general in Colorado history. He has also served as an adjunct professor of natural resources and advanced Constitutional law at the Sturm College of Law. From 2015 to 2019, Domenico served as principal of Kittredge, LLC.

In early 2017, President Donald Trump appointed Neil Gorsuch to the Supreme Court of the United States. Trump considered nominating Domenico to succeed Gorsuch on the United States Court of Appeals for the Tenth Circuit, but ultimately chose Colorado Supreme Court Justice Allison H. Eid, who was successfully confirmed.

Federal judicial service 

On September 28, 2017, President Donald Trump announced his intent to nominate Domenico to an undetermined seat on the United States District Court for the District of Colorado. On October 2, 2017, he was officially nominated to the seat vacated by Judge Robert E. Blackburn, who assumed senior status on April 12, 2016.

On January 3, 2018, his nomination was returned to the President under Rule XXXI, Paragraph 6 of the United States Senate. On January 5, 2018, President Donald Trump announced his intent to renominate Domenico to a federal judgeship. On January 8, 2018, his renomination was sent to the Senate. On January 24, 2018, a hearing on his nomination was held before the Senate Judiciary Committee. On February 15, the Senate Judiciary Committee voted to report Domenico's nomination by an 11–10 vote.

On January 3, 2019, his nomination was returned to the President under Rule XXXI, Paragraph 6 of the United States Senate. On January 23, 2019, President Trump announced his intent to renominate him for a federal judgeship. His nomination was sent to the Senate later that day. On February 7, 2019, his nomination was reported out of committee by a 12–10 vote. On April 9, 2019, the Senate invoked cloture on his nomination by a 55–42 vote. Later that day, his nomination was confirmed by a 57–42 vote. He received his judicial commission on May 7, 2019.

Memberships 

He has been an intermittent member of the Federalist Society since 2000.

References

External links 
 
 Appearances at the U.S. Supreme Court from the Oyez Project

|-

1972 births
Living people
20th-century American lawyers
21st-century American lawyers
21st-century American judges
American people of Italian descent
Colorado lawyers
Federalist Society members
Georgetown University alumni
Judges of the United States District Court for the District of Colorado
People from Boulder, Colorado
Solicitors General of Colorado
United States district court judges appointed by Donald Trump
University of Denver faculty
University of Virginia School of Law alumni
People associated with Hogan Lovells